The Cayubaba people are an ethnic group in the Beni Department of Bolivia. There were 2,203 of them in 2012 of whom 1,246 speak the Cayubaba language natively.

References

Ethnic groups in Bolivia